The Julian Hotel, located in Corvallis, Oregon, is listed on the National Register of Historic Places.

See also
 National Register of Historic Places listings in Benton County, Oregon

References

External links

1910 establishments in Oregon
Buildings and structures in Corvallis, Oregon
Colonial Revival architecture in Oregon
Hotel buildings completed in 1910
Hotel buildings on the National Register of Historic Places in Oregon
Hotels in Corvallis, Oregon
National Register of Historic Places in Benton County, Oregon
Historic American Buildings Survey in Oregon